Mirza Nali (born Mirza Muhammad Nali, Shahzada (Begzada) of the Mughal Empire 1784–1860), was the Crown Prince before Bahadur Shah II. He was the son of Akbar Shah II who became an outlaw after the Sepoy Mutiny of 1857. He took refuge in parts of Hindustan.

His father Akbar II died in the evening on 28 September 1837. Bahadur Shah Zafar ascended to the throne of Delhi. Bahadur Shah was born in the 1775 and at the time of his enthronement he was 62 years of age. He was a very modest, well spoken, Sufi poet.  His father had tried to pass on the title to his younger brother Mirza Salim, also known as Mirza Jahangir. However, Mirza Salim hated the British and called the Resident Stein by the mocking name of "Lulu". He also shot at the resident and as a consequence was exiled to Allahabad.  The British as a result were opposed to making Mirza Jahangir the Crown Prince.  After that Shah Alam Badshah tried to make Mirza Nali the Crown Prince, this too failed and in the end Bahadur Shah ascended the throne.

References

 The Eighth Section of the Series on the Mutiny in Delhi, Khwaja Hasan Nizami 

Pretenders to the throne of the Mughal Empire
1784 births
1860 deaths
People from Allahabad

fr:Muhammad Mirza Nali
ja:アクバル・シャー2世